State of the World Address is the third studio album by American heavy metal band Biohazard, released on May 24, 1994, by Warner Bros. Records. Sen Dog has a guest performance on the song "How It Is".  Until 2012's Reborn in Defiance, this would be the final album to feature guitarist Bobby Hambel, who would leave the band after touring due to musical differences.

 contains audio samples taken from the Quentin Tarantino film Reservoir Dogs.

Marketing
Billboard magazine detailed a long-term marketing strategy developed and executed by Warner Bros. for  Biohazard's breakout from the underground into mainstream culture, as marked by the highly anticipated State of the World Address. The magazine quoted the great exuberance expressed by several retail outlet representatives and by the Warner Bros. label, about the band as a new "legitimate commercial force".

The label included its alternative marketing department in deploying many "low-key" tactics of marketing directly to retail stores without the "perception of hype", to raise the industry's general awareness of the band's existence and message. The label created a censored version of the album for radio stations, and an electronic press kit detailing the music's social issues was distributed to retailers. A 1980 Chevy Malibu emblazoned with the Biohazard logo was driven around Southern California, with label representatives passing out materials to cross-market the band with various social justice organizations.

The band appeared on Beavis and Butt-Head, and the album's development was detailed for three weeks on MTV's Headbangers Ball. There were two contests to discover fans who bore the best Biohazard tattoos. The album was marketed to alternative radio stations in addition to metal stations.

Reception

Critical
Entertainment Weekly gave the album a B+, saying that with this album, the band is "redefining metal not only by writing what amount to modern-day protest songs, but also by creating thrash that grooves rather than lumbers" and concluding that "metal rarely gets as fierce or as forward-thinking as it does here".

In 2016, Metal Hammer placed the album on its list of the top 10 rap metal albums. The review says the album "brought tough street-metal grit to bear upon flagrant boom-bap grooves", summarizing with this: "Rap-metal by default rather than design, it was a natural and neat fit for a band that deserves more credit for their pioneering nous."

Sales
Billboard 200 recognized this as the first Biohazard album to enter its chart, at number 48 in the first week and number 88 in the second week. Sales of 22,000 units were reported in the first week. It also sold an additional 160,000 copies outside the US in its first week, primarily in Germany.

Track listing

 Track 14 contains a hidden track, an a cappella titled "Ink", professing the band's love of tattoo art. "Love Denied" ends at 4:40, with the hidden track beginning at 4:54.

Personnel

Evan Seinfeld – bass, vocals
Billy Graziadei – guitars, vocals
Bobby Hambel – guitars
Danny Schuler – drums
Sen Dog – guest vocals on "How It Is"
Ed Stasium – producer, mixer

Charts

References

Biohazard (band) albums
1994 albums
Albums produced by Ed Stasium
Warner Records albums